Al-Bassel High School for Outstanding Students, founded in 1998, was the first high school established in Syria to provide secondary education exclusively for superior students. Students are required to pass several exams after finishing elementary school in order to be enrolled.

History
Al-Bassel high school was established in order to take care of outstanding Syrian students, being a national treasure, through the development of their intellectual abilities and practical manners and in accordance with their mental aptitudes and the level of academic achievements.

This institution came in line with trends in educational policy in raising the level of qualitative performance of the educational process and upgrade them to be effective in meeting the requirements of the overall development and progress of society.

The Ministry of Education created a school in each province, dedicated for high achieving students; each school includes middle and upper levels, starting with the academic year (1998–1999) according to specific criteria for admission.

External links

http://albasel-aleppo.tripod.com/ 
 

Schools in Syria
Educational institutions established in 1998
1990s establishments in Syria